The 2007 Roady's Humanitarian Bowl, part of the 2007-08 NCAA football bowl games season, was played on December 31, 2007, at Bronco Stadium on the campus of Boise State University in Boise, Idaho.

Once again, the invited teams were from the Atlantic Coast Conference (Georgia Tech) and Western Athletic Conference (Fresno State).

The Yellow Jackets were in a transition period between previous head coach Chan Gailey, fired in late November, and new head coach Paul Johnson, hired on December 7.  Jon Tenuta, the team's defensive coordinator, coached the "Ramblin' Wreck" in this game.

References

Humanitarian Bowl
Famous Idaho Potato Bowl
Fresno State Bulldogs football bowl games
Georgia Tech Yellow Jackets football bowl games